"Under the Sun" is a country rock song by New Zealand band L.A.B., released as a single from their album L.A.B. V in December 2021. The song was a commercial success, debuting at number 12 in New Zealand, and becoming the 35th most successful song of 2022 in the country.

Background and composition

The song was written in mid-2021, by band member Brad Kora, who also produced the track. The song was debuted by the band as a part of their 2021 tour.

Release

The song was released as a single by L.A.B. on 17 December 2021, on the same day as the album L.A.B. V was released.

Critical reception

Alex Behan of Stuff felt "blow[n] away" by the track, feeling that it was like a song released by a different band. Behan praised the song as "perfectly structured, with just a tinge of country twang that sounds like it could have existed forever." Tim Gruar of Ambient Light Blog gave the song a mixed review, feeling it was a middle of the road track.

Credits and personnel

A Adams-Tamatea – bass
M Gregory – organ, piano
B Kora – drums, lyrics, percussion, producer, songwriting
S Kora – acoustic guitar
L.A.B. – arrangement
J Shadbolt – backing vocals, electric guitar, lap steel guitar, lead vocals

Charts

Weekly charts

Year-end charts

Certifications

References

2021 singles
2021 songs
L.A.B. songs